John O'Rourke (born 31 March 1992) is an Irish Gaelic footballer who plays as a left wing-forward for the Cork senior team.

Born in Rosscarbery, County Cork, O'Rourke first played competitive Gaelic football during his schooling at Mount St. Michael. He arrived on the inter-county scene at the age of seventeen when he first linked up with the Cork minor team, before later joining the under-21 side. He made his senior debut during the 2013 championship. Since then O'Rourke has become a regular member of the starting fifteen.

O'Rourke has also lined out with the Munster inter-provincial team. At club level he plays with Carbery Rangers.

Career statistics

Club

Honours

Team

Cork
Munster Under-21 Football Championship (3): 2011, 2012, 2013
Munster Minor Football Championship (1): 2010

References

1992 births
Living people
Carbery Rangers Gaelic footballers
Cork inter-county Gaelic footballers
Munster inter-provincial Gaelic footballers
People from Rosscarbery